The Colony is a 1995 American made-for-television thriller drama film starring John Ritter, Mary Page Keller, and  Hal Linden. The film was written and directed by Rob Hedden.

Plot

Following a carjacking, a man and his family move into an Orwellian-like gated community where the billionaire owner controls the residents' lives. There are draconian rules, armed guards all over, and cameras in all the rooms. Then sinister things begin to happen.

John Ritter is a tech guy that sells smart house technology. To escape the crime ridden Inner City, he makes a deal  with a billionaire to put his smart house tech into all the homes in a gated community that the billionaire owns called The Colony.

Ritter and his family are then invited to come and live in The Colony. John Ritter can't really afford to live in such a nice place, but the nice billionaire helps him make it work. Ritter and his family move into The Colony into a lovely house far beyond  that which he would normally be able to afford  The morning after moving in John decides to go for a jog around The Colony with his pet dog and as he is leaving his home he notices that a rule book for living in The Colony has been delivered to his house. The rule book is about as thick as a phone book and John Ritter tells his dog that he will read it later.   Little does he know how sinister The Colony really is.

Cast
John Ritter as Rick Knowlton
Mary Page Keller as Leslie Knowlton
Hal Linden as Philip Denig
Alexandra Picatto as Danielle Knowlton
Cody Dorkin as Andy Knowlton
Marshall R. Teague as Doug Corwin
Todd Jeffries as Mike Knowlton
June Lockhart as Mrs. Billingsly
John Wesley as Jerry Franklin
Frank Bonner as Frank Williamson
Michele Scarabelli as Sandi Barnett 
Dan Gilvezan as Steve Barnett
 Alla Korot as Jessica James

Reception

Critical response
Tony Scott of Variety wrote in his review: "June Lockhart, who knows how to handle the role, cunningly dominates the private school system. There's no privacy, and there's a secret attempt by a patrol to search the Ritter family's house for a vital missing computer disk that the former tenants squirreled away before they were sent over a cliff by Teague. [...] Tech credits are good. Main trouble with The Colony is that, as a suspenser, it isn't much fun. Plays like a summer throwaway."

Release
The Colony was released on September 13, 1995, on the USA Network. The film was released on VHS on March 12, 1996, by Universal Pictures Home Entertainment.
It has yet to be released on DVD or video-on-demand.

TV Series
In 2016, USA Network produced a series of the same name that features a similar premise, but with science fiction elements.

References

1995 films
1995 television films
1990s thriller drama films
American thriller drama films
Films scored by Dennis McCarthy
Films about families
Films about security and surveillance
American thriller television films
USA Network original films
Films directed by Rob Hedden
Films with screenplays by Rob Hedden
1995 drama films
1990s American films